Theodore Palaiologos Kantakouzenos (after 1361 – 1410) was a Byzantine nobleman and probable close relation to the Emperor John VI Kantakouzenos.

Background
Theodore is theorised to have been the son of Matthew Kantakouzenos, son of Emperor John VI, and his wife Irene Palaiologina. Were this identification to be accurate, Theodore would likely have been born after the couple had taken residence in the Peloponnese in 1361, since he was not listed by the former emperor as being among his descendants prior to this time. Alternatively, given the unusually large age gap between Theodore's children and Matthew, it may be more likely that Theodore was instead the child of one of Matthew's sons, Demetrios or John, both of whom had reached maturity by 1361. As there is evidence to support both identifications, it is not possible to establish Theodore's parentage with any more certainty. The referral in historical sources of Theodore as the theíos (uncle) of Emperor Manuel II Palaiologos does not offer any further clarification as by this point, theíos had become a general term for cousin.

Life
Theodore was probably among the volunteers who left Constantinople in 1383 to join Manuel II in the defence of Thessaloniki against the Turks. He is known to have maintained correspondence with Demetrios Kydones and John Chortasmenos, who had composed verses giving praise to his house as well as to Theodore himself.

During the summer of 1397, Constantinople was besieged by the Ottomans under Sultan Bayezid I. Due to the desperation of the situation, Theodore, alongside John of Natala, was sent to the court of Charles VI of France as an imperial ambassador, bearing a letter from Manuel requesting the French king's military aid. Arriving in October, Theodore was received by a sympathetic Charles, who treated the ambassadors with great courtesy and promised to send assistance within the year. Further to this, Charles also provided funds for the two nobles to travel to the British Isles to treat with King Richard II of England, with the aim of soliciting further aid. Though the latter was too distracted by domestic troubles at this point to provide any support, Theodore and John were able to return with six hundred French troops led by the Marshal Boucicaut, clearing the immediate approach to Constantinople and breaking the blockade.

In the autumn of 1398, Theodore was named ambassador to Venice, where he maintained both a commercial presence as well as a political one, and was awarded citizenship of the republic by the Doge in December of that year. In 1409, he attended the synod in Constantinople which condemned the two wayward bishops, Makarios of Ankyra and Matthew of Medeia. He was described as being a Senator during this time. He died of plague in 1410.

Family
Theodore's wife was Helena Ouresina Doukaina, a daughter of John Uroš, ruler of Thessaly. He is believed to have had the following issue:
George Palaiologos Kantakouzenos, "Sachatai" (d. circa 1456–59), scholar and military commander, defended Smederevo during a Hungarian attack in 1456
Andronikos Palaiologos Kantakouzenos (d. June 3/4, 1453, executed), the last Grand Domestic of the Byzantine Empire
Thomas Kantakouzenos (d. July 25, 1463 in Adrianople), diplomat for Đurađ Branković, Despot of Serbia
Irene Kantakouzene (d. May 1457), wife of Serbian Despot Đurađ Branković
Helena Kantakouzene or Theodora Kantakouzene, Empress of Trebizond
 A daughter who married George VIII, King of Georgia

The Byzantist Donald Nicol, who initially attributed the offspring to Demetrios Kantakouzenos, later reversed his position and stated that it was more likely that Theodore was the actual father. His reason was that, given that George's eldest son was also named Theodore, the new theory would correlate with a common Byzantine practice of naming the eldest son for their grandfather. Similarly, one of Irene's sons was named Todor, possibly also being named after Theodore.

Notes

References

14th-century Byzantine people
Palaiologos dynasty
Theodore
1360s births
1410 deaths
15th-century Byzantine people
15th-century Greek people
15th-century deaths from plague (disease)
Byzantine diplomats
Ambassadors to France
Ambassadors of the Byzantine Empire to the Republic of Venice